František Jílek (May 22, 1913 – September 16, 1993) was a Czech conductor, known especially for his interpretation of Leoš Janáček's works.

Life 
Jílek began studying piano and composition as a pupil of Jaroslav Kvapil, and later studied conducting under Antonín Balatka and Zdeněk Chalabala at the Brno Conservatory. In 1937, Jílek completed his education at the Prague Conservatory, in the master class of Vítězslav Novák. From 1938 to 1949 he conducted the opera in Ostrava.  In 1952, he became the principal conductor of the Janáček Opera in Brno, a position he held for 25 years. During his career Jílek frequently conducted the orchestra of the National Theatre in Prague, the Czech Philharmonic, as well as orchestras abroad.  In 1978, he became the conductor of the Brno Philharmonic Orchestra.

Work 
He conducted the complete operas of Bedřich Smetana and Leoš Janáček, and also focused on Russian and Italian operatic repertoire. The recordings of his interpretations of Janáček's, Novák's and Martinů's work are available on the Czech label Supraphon. He was awarded the Orphée d'Or de l'Academie National du Disque Lyrique (Prix Arturo Toscanini-Paul Vergnes) for the recording of Janáček's opera Jenůfa in 1980.

Footnotes

References 
Jaroslav Smolka: Malá encyklopedie hudby. Prague: Editio Supraphon, 1983.
Jiří Ort: Pozdní divoch. Láska a život Leoše Janáčka v operách a dopisech. Prague: Mladá fronta, 2005.

Selected recordings 
 Fibich: The Bride of Messina CD. 11 1492-2 612 (Supraphon)
 Janáček: The Excursions of Mr. Brouček CD. 11 2153-20612 (Supraphon)
 Janáček: Destiny CD. SU 0045-2 611 (Supraphon)
 Janáček: Jenůfa CD. SU 3869-2 612 (Supraphon)
 Janáček: Orchestral Works I.-III. CD. SU 3886-3888-2 031 (Supraphon)

External links 
 List of recordings on Supraphon

Jilek Franisek
1993 deaths
Czech conductors (music)
Male conductors (music)
20th-century conductors (music)
20th-century Czech male musicians
Brno Conservatory alumni